The men's Greco-Roman featherweight competition at the 1936 Summer Olympics in Berlin took place from 6 August to 9 August at the Deutschlandhalle. Nations were limited to one competitor. This weight class was limited to wrestlers weighing up to 61kg.

This Greco-Roman wrestling competition continued to use the "bad points" elimination system introduced at the 1928 Summer Olympics, with a slight modification. Each round featured all wrestlers pairing off and wrestling one bout (with one wrestler having a bye if there were an odd number). The loser received 3 points if the loss was by fall or unanimous decision and 2 points if the decision was 2-1 (this was the modification from prior years, where all losses were 3 points). The winner received 1 point if the win was by decision and 0 points if the win was by fall. At the end of each round, any wrestler with at least 5 points was eliminated.

Schedule

Results

Round 1

Six wrestlers made it through the first round with 0 bad points, 5 by wins via fall (or opponent withdrawal) and 1 through a bye. The four other winners by decision each received 1 point. Sestak lost by a split decision and received 2 points. Seven of the eight remaining losers were defeated by fall or unanimous decision and received 3 points. Nielsen was unable to finish his bout due to injury and withdrew. Scherpenisse also withdrew after his bout.

 Bouts

 Points

Round 2

The lead group of six was cut to three, with Erkan having a bye and Hering and Slazak each winning their second decision by fall to stay at 0 points. Two wrestlers finished the second round with 1 point (one win by fall and one win by decision, in either order). Borgia earned his second point with a second win by decision. Four wrestlers moved to 3 points (win by fall or bye and loss by unanimous decision or fall). Three stayed barely alive with 4 points (win by decision and loss by unanimous decision or fall). Four were eliminated with two losses; of these, Sestak had the best record with 5 points rather than 6 for the others due to his first loss coming via split decision.

 Bouts

 Points

Round 3

Erkan finished the round in sole possession of the lead, winning a second bout by fall (along with an earlier bye) to stay at 0 points. Hering's third win was his first by decision, moving him to 1 point. Borgia and Karlsson also each ended the round at 3–0, but they had two wins by decision and one by fall to sit at 2 points. Slazak picked up his first points in the round, earning 3 with the loss. Móri and Kundsinsch also stayed at 3 points with wins by fall in the round. Horvath avoided elimination with a win by fall to stay at 4 points; Reini joined him at 4 points by earning 3 in a loss. Four men were eliminated with their second loss this round, finishing at either 6 or 7 points depending on the quality of their wins.

 Bouts

 Points

Round 4

Erkan won by fall again, maintaining his 0 point record; the loss eliminated Borgia, despite it being his first, because he had earned 2 points previously by wins via decision. Hering earned a second point in giving Slazak his second loss, eliminating the latter. Karlsson also finished the round at 2 points, staying there by defeating Móri by fall (Móri was also eliminated). Kundsinsch's bye kept him at 3 points. Reini and Horvath faced off in a potential double-elimination bout as both had 4 points and a decision would push both out, but Reini won by fall to remain in competition. Thus, all four losers in the round were eliminated while all four winners (plus the man with the bye) remained alive.

 Bouts

 Points

Round 5

Again, and somewhat unusually for the format, the losers were eliminated but the winners continued. Erkan received his first point, a single for beating Kundsinsch by decision. Karlsson also won by decision over Hering, receiving his third point. Reini avoided any chance of elimination with a bye in the round.

 Bouts

 Points

Round 6

In the sixth round, Reini gave Erkan the latter's first loss, putting both men at 4 points. Karlsson had a bye, staying at 3 points.

 Bouts

 Points

Round 7

Erkan secured the gold medal while idle in the seventh and final round. The loser of the match between Reini and Karlsson was guaranteed the bronze. A Reini win by fall would have put Reini and Erkan even at 4 points, with Reini winning by virtue of the head-to-head tie-breaker from round 6. A Karlsson win would have set up a final match between Karlsson and Erkan, who had not yet faced each other. The actual result, however was a Reini win by decision—which eliminated both Reini and Karlsson with 5 points (Karlsson would have had 6 if the decision were unanimous rather than split, but Reini would take silver and Karlsson bronze either way). Erkan was thus left as the lone remaining contestant at 4 points and therefore the victor.

 Bouts

 Points

References

Wrestling at the 1936 Summer Olympics